Talkin is a village in Cumbria, England, close to Talkin Tarn.

Etymology
The name is of Brittonic origin. The Brittonic dialect known as Cumbric was formerly spoken in the area. According to A. M. Armstrong, et al., the first element, tal, means "brow" or "end" in Brittonic and modern Welsh, Cornish, and Breton. The second element is unclear. It may come from the Brittonic word which appears in Welsh and Old Cornish as can ("white") and Breton as kann ("bland, brilliant"). Talkin may be a hill-name meaning "white brow".

See also

Listed buildings in Hayton, Carlisle

References

External links
 Cumbria County History Trust: Hayton (nb: provisional research only – see Talk page)

Villages in Cumbria
Hayton, Carlisle